Emma is an unincorporated community located in Iberia Parish, Louisiana, United States. This mostly rural community is located 6.3 miles away from New Iberia.

Unincorporated communities in Louisiana
Unincorporated communities in Iberia Parish, Louisiana